Tadeusz Kossak (1 January 1857 in Paris – 3 July 1935 in Górki Wielkie), was born into a noted Polish family of artists and writers. He was an officer in the Polish Army, a freedom fighter, and owner of a country estate in Górki Wielkie that became a hub for intellectuals of the era. He was the father of writer, activist, and World War II resistance fighter Zofia Kossak-Szczucka.

Biography 
He was the son of the celebrated painter Juliusz Kossak, and twin brother to another noted painter, Wojciech Kossak. After the family's return to Poland from his birthplace of France, Kossak attended school first in Warsaw and later in Kraków. He came to prominence in 1906 when he was arrested for political activism against Imperial Russian authorities and the foreign occupation of Poland. During World War I, in 1917, he joined the Polish Corps of Józef Dowbor-Muśnicki fighting for Polish independence.

In 1922 with his wife Anna (née Kisielnicka), he moved from Kresy Wschodnie in Eastern Poland to Górki Wielkie near Cieszyn in Silesia. There they leased from the state a country estate where they hosted many intellectuals of the period, including Jan Parandowski, Maria Dąbrowska, Jan Sztaudynger, Melchior Wańkowicz, Wojciech Kossak, Maria Pawlikowska-Jasnorzewska, Magdalena Samozwaniec, Jadwiga Witkiewicz, and her husband, Stanisław Ignacy Witkiewicz.

In 1925 Kossak published his war memoires, Wspomnienia wojenne (1918-1920) about the war against The Bolsheviks. He was also the author of a book titled "Jak to było w armii austriackiej" - 'How it was in the Austrian Army' - published in 1927. He died in July 1935 and is buried in Górki Wielkie.

References

  ZKS Fundacja im. Zofii Kossak,  Historia dworu Kossaków (History of the Kossak Manor) official webpage of the Foundation
   Kalendarium Niepospolitego Rodu Kossaków, Towarzystwo Przyjaciół Ziemi Poryckiej

1857 births
1935 deaths
Polish independence activists
Polish male writers
People from Paris
Polish Army officers
Polish twins